Philip E. Orbanes is an American board game designer, author, founding partner and former president of Winning Moves Games in Danvers, Massachusetts. Orbanes is a graduate of the Case Institute of Technology (now Case Western Reserve University). He was a Senior Vice President for Research and Development at Parker Brothers until the 1990s. Orbanes has also served as Chief Judge at U.S. National and World Monopoly tournaments.

Orbanes has written three books about the board game Monopoly (his book The Monopoly Companion has been printed in three distinct editions). His Monopoly: The World’s Most Famous Game and How It Got That Way is considered the definitive reference book. He also wrote a book about the history of Parker Brothers from the 1880s to the start of the 21st century. His book about the card game Rook, however, is only found packaged along with the game's cards, published by Winning Moves Games. Orbanes also authored articles for The Games Journal on acquiring the rights to out of print games, and the card game, Canasta.

Orbanes was prominently featured in the documentary Under the Boardwalk: The Monopoly Story for his role serving as the Chief Judge at U.S. and World Monopoly Championships for over 30 years.

Life
Philip E. Orbanes was born in 1947. When in college, he started his first game company. Orbanes went to work for Parker Bros at age 32 as head of research and development.

In 1995, Orbanes co-founded Winning Moves Games. He then created the Speed Die for the Monopoly game adding it to Winning Moves' Monopoly Mega Edition (2006).

Bibliography

References

Case Western Reserve University alumni
Living people
People from Gloucester, Massachusetts
Year of birth missing (living people)
Board game designers
American male writers